Parodiolyra is a genus of Neotropical plants in the grass family.

Species
 Parodiolyra aratitiyopensis J.R.Grande - Venezuela (Amazonas)
 Parodiolyra colombiensis Davidse & Zuloaga - Colombia (Caquetá)
 Parodiolyra lateralis (J.Presl ex Nees) Soderstr. & Zuloaga - Nicaragua, Costa Rica, Panama, Colombia, Venezuela, Guyana, Suriname, Ecuador, Peru, Brazil (Roraima, Amazonas)
 Parodiolyra luetzelburgii (Pilg.) Soderstr. & Zuloaga - Brazil, Colombia, Venezuela, Guyana, Suriname, French Guiana
 Parodiolyra micrantha (Kunth) Davidse & Zuloaga - Brazil, Colombia, Venezuela, Guyana, Suriname, French Guiana, Peru, Bolivia, Argentina, Paraguay
 Parodiolyra ramosissima (Trin.) Soderstr. & Zuloaga - Brazil (Bahia)

References

Bambusoideae
Bambusoideae genera
Grasses of North America
Grasses of South America